The Very Best of Jessi Colter: An Outlaw, a Lady is a compilation album released by Capitol records; the collection features Country music singer Jessi Colter's biggest hits from the 1970s and 1980s.

The album includes Colter's signature song, the pop-country crossover hit "I'm Not Lisa", plus, its follow-up -- "What's Happened to Blue Eyes"—which reached #5 on the Country charts in 1975. The album includes nine of Colter's ten total charted hits.

Track listing 
"You Mean to Say" - 2:30
"Suspicious Minds" (with Waylon Jennings) - 3:57
"Under Your Spell Again" (with Waylon Jennings) - 2:53
"I'm Not Lisa" - 3:23
"What's Happened to Blue Eyes" - 2:22
"You Ain't Been Loved (Like I'm Gonna Love You)" - 2:59
"Storms Never Last" (with Waylon Jennings) - 4:16
"It's Morning (And I Still Love You)" - 2:25
"Without You" - 3:59
"Here I Am" - 3:46
"I Belong to Him" - 4:06
"New Wine" - 3:50
"I Thought I Heard You Calling My Name" - 3:57
"You Hung the Moon (Didn't You Waylon?)" - 3:23
"Maybe You Should've Been Listening" - 4:39
"That's the Way a Cowboy Rocks and Rolls" - 3:24
"Hold Back the Tears" - 3:03
"The Wild Side of Life/It Wasn't God Who Made Honky Tonk Angels" (medley) (with Waylon Jennings) - 3:21

References

Jessi Colter albums
2003 greatest hits albums
Capitol Records compilation albums